was a music venue in Minato, Tokyo, which opened in April 1996, and was owned and operated by Tokyo Broadcasting System Television, Inc. On September 22, 2020, the venue was permanently shut down due to COVID-19. As part of a redevelopment plan that involved the demolition of several TBS buildings in the area, it closed from 2003 until its reopening on March 20, 2008. Since the naming rights were acquired by the Mynavi Corporation, the venue has been known as  since November 2017. Fishmans' final concert was performed here.

References

External links
 
 

Former music venues
Music venues in Tokyo
Tokyo Broadcasting System
Music venues completed in 1996
1996 establishments in Japan
2020 disestablishments in Japan
Buildings and structures in Minato, Tokyo
Akasaka, Tokyo